Ambient 4: On Land is the eighth solo studio album by British ambient musician Brian Eno. Released in 1982, it was the final edition in Eno's ambient series, which began in 1978 with Music for Airports.

Overview

On Land is a mixture of synthesizer-based notes, nature/animal recordings, and a complex array of other sounds, most of which were unused, collected recordings from previous albums and the sessions that created them. As Eno explained, "... the making of records such as On Land involved feeding unheard tape into the mix, constant feeding and remixing, subtracting and "composting".

Eno actually found, in the three-year process of making the album, that the synthesizer came to be of "limited usefulness" and that his "instrumentation shifted gradually through electro-mechanical and acoustic instruments towards non-instruments like pieces of chain and sticks and stones ... I included not only recordings of rooks, frogs and insects, but also the complete body of my own earlier work".

Eno, cognizant of the deeper aural qualities, said, "On the whole, On Land is quite a disturbed landscape: some of the undertones deliberately threaten the overtones, so you get the pastoral prettiness on top, but underneath there's a dissonance that's like an impending earthquake".

Eno also had something to say about how music—this album in particular—should be listened to. In the liner notes, he suggested (even going so far as to draw a diagram) "a three-way speaker system that is both simple to install and inexpensive, and which seems to work very well on any music with a broad stereo image".

Track names 

The album makes reference to definite geographical places, such as Lizard Point, the exposed, southernmost tip of mainland Britain, close to Land's End in South-West England.

"Tal Coat" refers to Pierre Louis Jacob (1905–1985), aka Pierre Tal-Coat, a proponent of the French form of abstract expressionism, Tachisme. This interest in painting is reflected in Eno's statement that the album was "an attempt to transpose into music something that you can do in painting: creating a figurative environment. At the beginning of the 20th century, the ambition of the great painters was to make paintings that were like music, which was then considered as the noblest art because it was abstract, not figurative. In contrast, my intention in On Land was to make music that was like figurative painting, but without referring to the history of music – more to a "history of listening""

"Lantern Marsh" was a place in East Anglia where he grew up. He remarks, "My experience of it derives not from having visited it (although I almost certainly did) but from having subsequently seen it on a map and imagining where and what it might be".

"Leeks Hills", Eno explains, "is a little wood (much smaller now than when I was young, and this not merely the effect of age and memory) which stands between Woodbridge and Melton. There isn't a whole lot left of it now, but it used to be quite extensive. To find it you travel down the main road connecting Woodbridge and it lies to your left as you go down the hill".

"Dunwich Beach, Autumn, 1960" is named after the once prosperous seaport of Dunwich, England, which eroded into the sea over a period of three hundred years.

Track listing

Personnel
 Brian Eno – various electronic, acoustic, and ambient elements
 Michael Beinhorn – synthesizer (track 1)
 Axel Gros – guitar (track 1)
 Bill Laswell – bass (track 1)
 Jon Hassell – trumpet (side one, track 4)
 Michael Brook – guitar (track 8)
 Daniel Lanois – live equalisation (track 8)
Technical
 Engineering: Andy Lyden (London), Barry Sage, Cheryl Smith, Daniel Lanois (Canada), John Potoker (NYC), Julie Last (NYC), Martin Bisi (Brooklyn), Neal Teeman (NYC)
 The frogs on track 6 were recorded in Choloma, Honduras by Felipe Orrego.
 Special thanks: Robert Quine, Alex Blair, Harold Budd, Laraaji and Danny Lanois "who contributed their encouragement and suggestions at the right times"
 Mastered by Greg Calbi at Sterling Sound, New York
 Artwork, Design & Text: Brian Eno
 Typography: Chong-Donnie

Versions

In popular culture
 "Mistaken Memories of Mediaeval Manhattan" is a 1981, 47-minute ambient video created by Eno which uses music from the album (cat # HEN 2134). Two time-lapse animated GIFS from the production – (133K) , (270K).This title was later repackaged with his Thursday Afternoon video as "14 Video Paintings", RykoDisc, (HNDVD 1508) 9 , 10.
 The Khumba Mela (Same as it Ever Was), A 1982 90-minute video filmed in the waterways of Kashmir in India about a Saddhu's pilgrimage by Albert Falzon, features music from the album (Hendring, HEN 2135) 11, 12, 13, 14.
 Mythological Lands – Symbols from the Magic Drum, by David Bickley, a film about Lapland (1990, 45 minutes) features music from the album 15, 16, 17.
 Ocean of Sound, a book by David Toop, has been accompanied by a 2-CD compilation including "Lizard Point" (Virgin AMBT 10; 7243 8 41367 2 7) 18, 19, 20.
 OHM: The Early Gurus of Electronic Music 1948–80 (Ellipsis Arts, 2000) features the track "Unfamiliar Wind (Leeks Hills) 21.
Shutter Island, (2010, Paramount Pictures) a film directed by Martin Scorsese, features the track "Lizard Point" as a part of its soundtrack.

See also
 Ambient 1: Music for Airports
 Ambient 2: The Plateaux of Mirror
 Ambient 3: Day of Radiance
 Ambient music
 Electronic music

References

Works cited

External links

 
 Liner notes from On Land
 Interview; Trouser Press, Aug 1982
 Interview; Musician mag, Oct 1982
 Interview; Modern Recording & Music, Oct 1982
 Interview; Reality Hackers, Winter 1988
 Interview; Sound On Sound Vol 4 Issue 3, Jan 1989
 Interview; MOJO 55, June 1998
 Stylus mag feature, 2004
 ProgArchives review 

Brian Eno albums
1982 albums
Albums produced by Brian Eno
E.G. Records albums